Gongrostylus is a genus of flowering plants in the family Asteraceae.

 Species
 Gongrostylus costaricensis (Kuntze) R.M.King & H.Rob. - Costa Rica, El Salvador, Panamá, Colombia, Ecuador
 Gongrostylus pipolyi H.Rob. - Colombia (Chocó + Antioquia)

References

Eupatorieae
Asteraceae genera
Flora of Central America
Flora of South America